José Jesús Lanza Morilla (born 10 August 1978) is a Spanish footballer who plays as a midfielder.

Club career
Born in Córdoba, Andalusia, Lanza made his senior debuts with Córdoba CF in the 1996–97 season, in Segunda División B. In 1999 summer he signed with Levante UD in Segunda División, playing his first game as a professional on 28 August by featuring 19 minutes in a 3–0 home win against UE Lleida.

After loan stints with Burgos CF and Cádiz CF, Lanza was released by the Valencian, and resumed his career in the lower levels, representing SD Ponferradina, UD Lanzarote, Lucentino Industrial, Lucena CF (two stints) and Peñarroya CF.

References

External links

1978 births
Living people
Footballers from Córdoba, Spain
Spanish footballers
Association football midfielders
Segunda División players
Segunda División B players
Tercera División players
Córdoba CF B players
Real Valladolid Promesas players
Levante UD footballers
Burgos CF footballers
Cádiz CF players
SD Ponferradina players
Lucena CF players